The Pirates! In an Adventure with Napoleon is the fourth novel in Gideon Defoe's The Pirates! series. It was released in May 2009.

Here the Pirate Captain quits pirating, after losing the Pirate of the Year award, to become a bee keeper on St. Helena (another cruel Black Bellamy trick.)

It comes after the books The Pirates! in an Adventure with Scientists, The Pirates! in an Adventure with Whaling (published in the U.S. as The Pirates! In an Adventure with Ahab,) and The Pirates! in an Adventure with Communists.

References

2008 British novels
British comedy novels
The Pirates!
Orion Books books